Moeche is a municipality in the province of A Coruña in the autonomous community of Galicia in northwestern Spain. It belongs to the comarca of Ferrol. It is home to a 14th-century castle, in the parish of San Xurxo. It has a square plan, with an 18 m-tall keep.

References

Municipalities in the Province of A Coruña